The North Fork Popo Agie River serves as part of the boundary between the Wind River Indian Reservation and Fremont County Wyoming. The river's headwaters are at Lonesome Lake in the Wind River Range, and it flows eastward until its end near Lander, Wyoming when it joins the Middle Fork Popo Agie River.

Fishing
The river is considered a Class 2 fishery by the Wyoming Game and Fish Department meaning it has very good trout waters of statewide importance. Different species of fish can be found, including rainbow trout, brook trout, cutthroat trout and mountain whitefish

References

Rivers of Wyoming
Wind River Indian Reservation